Drest was king of the Picts, in modern Scotland, from about 834 until 837.  He was the son of King Caustantín and succeeded his uncle, Óengus, to the throne.

The length of his reign is based on the various Pictish king lists, where he is associated with Talorgan son of Uuthoil. Some sources, such as John of Fordun, conflate the two kings as "Durstolorger", perhaps under the influence of the earlier "Dubthalorc".

It was once thought that Pictish kings in this period were also kings of Dál Riata, but this is no longer supported.

See also
 House of Óengus

References

Anderson, Alan Orr, Early Sources of Scottish History A.D 500–1286, volume 1. Reprinted with corrections. Paul Watkins, Stamford, 1990. 
Broun, Dauvit. "Pictish Kings 761-839: Integration with Dál Riata or Separate Development" in Sally Foster (ed.) The St Andrews Sarcophagus: A Pictish masterpiece and its international connections. Dublin: Four Courts Press, 1998. 

837 deaths
Pictish monarchs
9th-century Scottish monarchs
Year of birth unknown